Joseph-François is a given name, and may refer to:

 Joseph-François Armand (1820-1903), Canadian politician
 Joseph-François de Payan (1759-1852), French political figure
 Joseph-François Deblois (1797-1860), Canadian lawyer, judge and political figure
 Joseph-François Duché de Vancy (1668-1704), French Playwright
 Joseph-François Garnier (1755-1825), French oboist and composer
 Joseph-François Kremer (born 1954), French composer, conductor and musicologist
 Joseph-François Lafitau (1681-1746), French Jesuit missionary and writer
 Joseph-François Lambert (1824-1873), French adventurer, businessman, and diplomat
 Joseph-François Malgaigne (1806-1865), French surgeon and surgical historian
 Joseph-François Mangin, French-American architect
 Joseph-François Perrault (1753-1844), Canadian businessman and political figure
 Joseph-François Poeymirau (1869–1924), French general

See also
 François-Joseph
 Joseph François
 Joseph-François-Louis-Charles